Mniodes radians is a species of plant in the family Asteraceae.

References 

radians